General elections were held in Dominican Republic on 15 May 2016 to elect a president, vice-president and the Congress, as well as 20 deputies to the Central American Parliament, municipal councils, mayors and vice mayors. On 15 May 2015 Roberto Rosario, president of the Central Electoral Board, said that there would be about 4,300 seats up for election in the "most complex elections in history".

Background
The previous parliamentary elections were held in 2010, and fresh elections would have usually been due in 2014 as Congress has a four-year term. However, in an effort to revert to the pre-1996 system and synchronize the dates of presidential and parliamentary and local elections in a single electoral year, the congressional term starting in 2010 was exceptionally extended to six years in order for the next congressional and municipal elections to be held alongside the next presidential elections due in 2016.

On 19 April 2015 the political committee of the ruling Dominican Liberation Party decided, without consensus, to amend the constitution to allow a president to be re-elected once, allowing incumbent President Danilo Medina to be presented for re-election, based on his high poll ratings. This led to tensions between party members and leaders, especially amongst supporters of Leonel Fernandez who was a pre-candidate for the elections. There was also an impasse in the Senate and Chamber of Deputies, where senators and representatives close to Fernandez stated that they would not vote in favour of the Act to Call the Revising National Assembly to amend the constitution. After several weeks of internal disputes, the political committee, including Fernandez and Medina, agreed on 28 May to vote for the amendment. The amendment passed the Chamber on June 2.

Electoral system
The president was elected using the two-round system; if no candidate had received more than 50% plus 1 of the vote, a second-round runoff would have been held in June 2016. Presidents are limited to serving two consecutive terms of four years.

In the Congress, the 190 members of the Chamber of Deputies were elected in three groups; 178 were elected using proportional representation from 32 multi-member constituencies based on the 31 provinces and the Distrito Nacional, with the number of seats based on the population of each province. A further seven were elected by proportional representation in a separate constituency for expatriates and five allocated nationally to parties that received at least 1% of the vote, with preference given to those that did not win any of the 178 constituency seats. The 32 members of the Senate were elected from the 31 provinces and the Distrito Nacional using first-past-the-post voting.

Coalitions
The coalition led by the Dominican Liberation Party includes:
Dominican Revolutionary Party
Alternative Democratic Movement
Social Democratic Institutional Bloc
Civic Renovation Party
Liberal Reformist Party
Green Socialist Party
Christian Democratic Union
Dominican Workers' Party
Institutional Democratic Party
Christian People's Party
Liberal Party of Action
People's Democratic Party
Citizen's Will National Party
Independent Revolutionary Party

The coalition led by the Modern Revolutionary Party includes:
Social Christian Reformist Party
Dominican Humanist Party
Broad Front
Dominicans for Change

Results

President

Congress

References

External links
Elections in the Dominican Republic: 2016 General Elections IFES

Dominican R
2016 in the Dominican Republic
Elections in the Dominican Republic
Presidential elections in the Dominican Republic
May 2016 events in North America